The Netherlands Competition Authority (Dutch: Nederlandse Mededingingsautoriteit, NMa) was the competition regulator for the Netherlands. After a merger with the Consumentenautoriteit and Onafhankelijke Post en Telecommunicatie Autoriteit on 1 April 2013, it became the Netherlands Authority for Consumers and Markets (Dutch: Autoriteit Consument en Markt). The Netherlands Competition Authority monitored all Dutch markets, to ensure fair competition.

The "Dutch office of Energy Regulation" (Energiekamer) was part of the Netherlands Competition Authority and committed to making energy markets work as effectively as possible.

Tasks 
The main goal for the Netherlands Competition Authority was to ensure fair competition between Dutch companies. In order to do so, it focused on 3 main tasks:
 To fight cartel-deals
 To prevent the abuse of economic strength, for example in virtual monopoly or oligopoly situations
 To check on the concentrations and spread of companies

See also
 Cartel

References

Competition regulators
Consumer organisations in the Netherlands
Regulation in the Netherlands